Khia Shamone Finch (Chambers; born November 8, 1976) is an American rapper, songwriter, singer, media personality, and record producer. 
She is best known for her highest-charting single, "My Neck, My Back (Lick It)", as well as other notable street hits such as "Snatch the Cat Back", "Respect Me", "K-Wang", and "Next Caller".

Early life 
Khia was born Khia Shamone Finch Chambers in Philadelphia and was raised in its Germantown neighborhood, and she moved to Tampa, Florida, when she was 11. Khia attended Dowdell Middle School and Hillsborough High School. She was expelled from Hillsborough during ninth grade and attended an alternative school afterwards. In 1991, Khia had her first child, a daughter also named Khia. In 1992, she moved to Honolulu, Hawaii, when the father was stationed there and had her second child, a son named Rashawn, while she was living with him. Before becoming a rapper, she worked as a bartender at Club XS in Tampa, Florida. Her mother Carol Belinda Chambers, who was a data entry specialist, died in 2001.

Music career

2000–2002: Thug Misses 

Khia released her debut album, Thug Misses, in 2002 on Dirty Down/Artemis Records as a re-release from the original version by Divine Records.  The lead single "My Neck, My Back (Lick It)" became a breakthrough single, charting at #42 on the Hot 100 chart and #12 on the Hot Rap Tracks chart. MTV News reported that she wrote "My Neck, My Back" in 15 minutes.

2003–2006: Gangstress 

In 2004, Khia appeared on a track with Trick Daddy and Tampa Tony called "Jump On It" from Trick's album Thug Matrimony: Married to the Streets.
Khia's second album was supposed to be released in 2003 by the title "Street Preacher". The album was complete by mid-2003, and was set for released by the end of 2003, but the album got shelved for unknown reasons. In 2006 Khia recorded another album to be her second album, Gangstress.

Khia's second album, Gangstress, was released on July 11, 2006, on Phase One Communications. It debuted at #67 on the Billboard R&B chart. Later in 2006, Khia also collaborated with Janet Jackson on her hit "So Excited", which peaked at #90 on the Hot 100 and #1 on the Hot Dance Club Play chart.

2007–2008: Nasti Muzik, Boss Lady Mixtape 

After signing to Big Cat Records, and still with her own label Thug Misses Entertainment, Khia finished working on her third studio album, Nasti Muzik, released on July 22, 2008. "What They Do" was the first promotional single on the album, which featured Atlanta rapper Gucci Mane. The first single, "Be Your Lady", was produced by Tampa's Push-a-Key Productions. Khia promoted the up-and-coming album by releasing a mixtape entitled The Boss Lady, which was hosted by DJ Scream.

Khia participated in the VH1 reality show Miss Rap Supreme in 2008. Khia was eliminated from the competition for rapping a song recorded prior to the show, "Respect Me".

2009–2012: Motor Mouf/Khia Shamone 

Khia began working on her fourth album, MotorMouf aka Khia Shamone, in 2009. On May 4, 2010, she released the lead single from the album, "Been a Bad Girl". A video for the single was shot in New York by Clifton Bell. The song showed a different, more sensitive side of the rapper. Following its release, Khia stopped by a local ABC News show to promote the single. In 2010, she told the website HipHopDX that the album will feature her singing instead of rapping on some of its cuts. A second single, a smooth R&B song, "So Addicted", followed "Been a Bad Girl". That track was compiled on the Khia Shamone section of the album. She's since released the singles, "Pay Your Pussy Bill" and "Georgia" from the album.

Discography 

 Thug Misses (2001)
 Gangstress (2006)
 Nasti Muzik (2008)
 MotorMouf aka Khia Shamone (2012)
 Love Locs (2014)
 QueenDomCum (2016)
 TwerkAnomics (2018)
 Don't Trust No N****s (2019)

Bibliography 
Love Yourself Hoe (2014)
Ignoring the Signs (2014)

References

External links 
 Khia on Myspace
 

1977 births
Living people
American women rappers
African-American women rappers
Epic Records artists
American hip hop singers
Rappers from Hawaii
Rappers from Philadelphia
Musicians from Tampa, Florida
Rappers from Florida
Southern hip hop musicians
21st-century American rappers
21st-century American women
21st-century African-American women
21st-century African-American musicians
20th-century African-American people
20th-century African-American women
21st-century women rappers